Parliamentary elections were held in the Grand Duchy of Finland on 1 and 2 August 1913. In 1914, the Russian government decided to suspend the Finnish Parliament for the duration of World War I.

Campaign
Finnish voters' growing frustration with Parliament's performance was reflected by the low voter turnout; the Social Democrats and Agrarians, championing the cause of poor workers and farmers, kept gaining votes at the expense of the Old Finns, whose main concern was the passive defence of Finland's self-government. They disagreed on the social and economic policies, and thus did not formulate very clear positions on them.

Results

References

General elections in Finland
Finland
Parliament
Finland
Election and referendum articles with incomplete results